Above Suspicion is a 1995 American crime thriller-drama film starring Christopher Reeve, Joe Mantegna and Kim Cattrall. The screenplay was written by William H. Macy, who also has a small role in the film. It premiered on HBO on May 21, 1995.

In the film, Reeve plays a paralyzed cop who plots to murder his wife. On May 27, 1995, a week after the film's release, Reeve himself was paralyzed from the shoulders down after suffering a spinal cord injury in a horse riding accident, as well as his final acting film to be released during his lifetime.

Plot
Dempsey Cain (Christopher Reeve) is a top detective in San Sebastian, California. His brother, Nick (Edward Kerr), is also a cop but is generally viewed as a screw-up despite Dempsey's attempts to help him. Nick is having an affair with Dempsey's wife, Gail (Kim Cattrall). Alan Rhinehart (Joe Mantegna) is another detective who thinks Dempsey is dirty and resents him for being the star on the force.

In part due to Nick's carelessness, Dempsey is shot during a night raid on a tenement building and his doctor says he is paralyzed from the waist down. Dempsey still covers for Nick's mistake. He is medically retired from the force.

Dempsey and Gail send their son, Damon, away to camp for the summer. Gail tells Nick that she dislikes being the wife of a disabled man. One night, Dempsey's neighbor, Iris (Finola Hughes), looks through her kitchen window and sees him pointing a gun at his head but she bangs on the door and seemingly stops him from committing suicide. Iris tells Gail about the attempt.

Dempsey informs Gail and Nick that he does not want to spend his life in a wheelchair and asks them to help him die. The pair agree to kill Dempsey and make it look like a botched home robbery. On the night it is set to happen, they sneak out of a movie theater after causing a commotion in order to create their alibi, go to the house, and start staging the scene. They take two pistols with silencers out of a dresser drawer. Nick puts his gun to Dempsey's head but cannot bring himself to shoot his brother. Gail aims her gun at her husband, pulls the trigger, and the gun clicks. Dempsey shoots Gail dead. He then informs Nick that he knew about the affair before rising from his wheelchair and shooting Nick dead.

The police conclude that Dempsey killed Gail and Nick in self-defense. Alan, however, becomes suspicious that Dempsey murdered them and begins to investigate, over the objections of his captain and other officers. He finds some inconsistencies in Dempsey's account and locates a man who forged a driver's license for Nick which he used to rent the car with which he drove himself and Gail to the house on the night of the murders.

Alan leaks his investigation to the press but denies doing so after a story about it appears in the newspaper. His captain reluctantly agrees to have Dempsey charged as the police cannot be seen as covering up a possible crime committed by one of their own. A pre-trial hearing is held where Dempsey's lawyer undermines much of the state's case. The judge rules that there is not sufficient evidence to proceed to trial and dismisses the matter.

Alan approaches Dempsey in the courtroom and tells him that he knows that he is a murderer and knows that he can walk. Alan then stabs Dempsey in the right thigh, expecting to elicit a physical reaction to prove that he actually can use his legs. Dempsey does not even wince and acts as if he did not feel the stabbing. Alan is arrested and loses his job. Dempsey begins dating Iris and starts a new life with her and Damon, while still pretending to be a paraplegic.

Cast
Christopher Reeve as Dempsey Cain
Joe Mantegna as Alan Rhinehart
Kim Cattrall as Gail Cain
Edward Kerr as Nick Cain
Geoffrey Rivas as Enrique
Finola Hughes as Iris
William H. Macy as Pros. Atty. Schultz
Ron Canada as Captain Lindsay
Natalia Nogulich as Def. Atty. Wallace
Clark Gregg as Randy
Marty Levy as Syd
Blake Foster as Damon Cain
Joanna Miles as Laura

Production and associated events
The film was shot in North Carolina.

Six days after the film premiered, Reeve fell from his horse during an equestrian competition in Virginia. He broke his neck and was paralyzed in the accident, necessitating the use of a wheelchair and ventilator for the rest of his life.

External links
 
 

1995 television films
1995 films
1990s thriller drama films
1990s erotic drama films
1990s erotic thriller films
American thriller drama films
Films about paraplegics or quadriplegics
Films shot in North Carolina
HBO Films films
American thriller television films
American erotic drama films
American erotic thriller films
1995 drama films
Films directed by Steven Schachter
Films scored by Michael Hoenig
1990s English-language films
American drama television films
1990s American films